The 2005–06 División de Honor Juvenil de Fútbol season was the 20th since its establishment.

Regular season

Copa de Campeones

Group A

Group B

Final

Details

See also
2006 Copa del Rey Juvenil

External links
 Royal Spanish Football Federation website

2005–06
Juvenil